This is a list of Mexican football transfers in the Mexican Primera Division during the winter 2012–13 transfer window, grouped by club. It only includes football transfers related to clubs from Liga MX, the first division of Mexican football.

Mexican Primera Division

América

In:

Out:

Atlante

In:

Out:

Atlas

In:

Out:

Chiapas

In:

Out:

Cruz Azul

In:

Out:

Guadalajara

In:

Out:

León

In:

Out:

Monterrey

In:

Out:

Morelia

In:

Out:

Pachuca

In:

Out:

Puebla

In:

Out:

Querétaro

In:

Out:

San Luis

In:

Out:

Santos Laguna

In:

Out:

Tijuana

In:

Out:

Toluca

In:

Out:

UANL

In:

Out:

UNAM

In:

Out:

See also 
 2012–13 Liga MX season

References

External links 

Winter 2012-13
Mexico
Tran
Tran